SWI/SNF-related matrix-associated actin-dependent regulator of chromatin subfamily D member 3 is a protein that in humans is encoded by the SMARCD3 gene.

Function 

The protein encoded by this gene is a member of the SWI/SNF family of proteins, whose members display helicase and ATPase activities and which are thought to regulate transcription of certain genes by altering the chromatin structure around those genes. The encoded protein is part of the large ATP-dependent chromatin remodeling complex SNF/SWI and has sequence similarity to the yeast Swp73 protein.

Multiple alternatively spliced transcript variants have been found for this gene. Mutually exclusive incorporation of the variants into the larger SWI/SNF complex are thought to direct the complex to remodel particular sites in chromatin, leading to alterations in gene activity that dictate cell behavior or differentiation during development and disease.

SMARCD3 together with TBX15 triggers development glycolytic fast-twitch muscles by the activation of the Akt/PKB signaling pathway.

References

Further reading